Arc of Infinity is the first serial of the 20th season of the British science fiction television series Doctor Who, which was first broadcast in four twice-weekly parts on BBC1 from 3 to 12 January 1983.

The serial is set in Amsterdam and on the planet Gallifrey. In the serial, the Time Lord traitor Hedin (Michael Gough) seeks to bring the founder of the Time Lords Omega (Ian Collier) out of the universe of antimatter by making him bond with the body of the Fifth Doctor (Peter Davison) in the universe of matter.

Plot
On Gallifrey, the Fifth Doctor's home planet, a Time Lord traitor steals the bio-data code of another Time Lord and provides it to the Renegade, a creature composed of antimatter. The High Council of the Time Lords issue a Warrant of Termination on the Doctor to ensure the Renegade can no longer bond with him. The Doctor is taken for execution, despite Nyssa's attempts to save him, and placed in a dispersal chamber.

Unbeknownst to the High Council, The Doctor's mind has been taken into the Matrix, the repository of all Time Lord knowledge, while his body is hidden. The Renegade, who demands an opportunity to return to the Universe it once inhabited, contacts him. The truth of the aborted execution is discovered by the Castellan, who tells Nyssa, Damon, and the High Council that the Doctor is alive.

In Amsterdam, the Doctor's former companion Tegan is looking for her cousin Colin Frazer. She is greeted by his friend Robin Stuart, who explains that Colin disappeared while they were crashing in the crypt of the Frankendael mansion. The Renegade, which has established its base at the Frankendael, finds them and uses Tegan as bait to force the Doctor to obey him. The Doctor is returned to normal space on Gallifrey where he makes for the High Council Chamber. 

Time Lord Councillor Hedin is revealed as the traitor who transmitted the bio-data. Hedin is in awe of his master Omega, first of the Time Lords and pioneer of time travel. Hedin wishes to release Omega from his exile in a universe of antimatter, not realising the great Time Lord has been driven insane by his years of solitary confinement. The Castellan kills Councillor Hedin, but this does not prevent Omega using the Arc of Infinity to seize total control of the Matrix and come to Earth. When he peels his decayed mask away, he reveals the features of the Doctor, whom he now perfectly resembles.

Omega leaves for Amsterdam with the Doctor and Nyssa in pursuit. Within a short time, the Doctor's prediction of an unstable transfer begins to come true: Omega's flesh decays and it is clear his new body is not permanent. When the Doctor and Nyssa catch up with him, it is a painful task for the Doctor to use the Ergon's antimatter converter on Omega, expelling him back to his own universe of antimatter. The Time Lord High Council on Gallifrey detects the end of the threat. Once Tegan has checked on her cousin's progress in hospital, she decides to rejoin the TARDIS crew.

Production

The working titles for this story were The Time of Neman and The Time of Omega. For Parts One and Two, the character of Omega was credited as "The Renegade" on the end credits. Colin Baker stated on Doctor Who: The Colin Baker Years video that John Nathan-Turner believed his performance was a little arch, and therefore gave him the nickname of Archie.

Substantial portions of the story were filmed on location in Amsterdam.  This was only the second time the show had filmed outside of Britain. John Nathan-Turner hoped to repeat the success of the first story filmed overseas, City of Death (1979). Amsterdam was chosen both because the BBC had recently developed contacts there and because it was cheap to arrange travel and hotel accommodations. Story writer Johnny Bryne had some trouble at first because the producers wanted a plot that made the Amsterdam setting a key factor in the course of events, rather than him just happening to be there.

Part One was broadcast on a Monday in contrast to the rest of this season's episodes, which were all transmitted on consecutive Tuesday and Wednesday evenings.

Cast notes
The story features a guest appearance by Michael Gough (who had previously played the Celestial Toymaker in the story of the same name). Leonard Sachs previously played Admiral Gaspard de Coligny in The Massacre of St Bartholomew's Eve (1966). Ian Collier previously played Stuart Hyde in The Time Monster (1972).

Colin Baker (who would later portray the Sixth Doctor) appeared in the serial as Commander Maxil. It was his performance in this role (which, according to Baker, producer John Nathan-Turner repeatedly told him to "tone down") that first brought him to the attention of the production office. Shortly after the production, the Assistant Floor Manager on the serial, Lynn Richards, invited Colin Baker to her wedding reception. Amongst the other guests were Ron Jones, Peter Davison, Sarah Sutton, Eric Saward, John Nathan-Turner and Gary Downie. Baker has said in a number of interviews that his entertaining form at the party directly led to his being cast as the Sixth Doctor the following year. Baker reprised the role of Maxil as an uncredited cameo in the 2006 Big Finish Productions audio play Gallifrey: Appropriation.

Elspet Gray, who played Thalia, later played Hera in the audio play Immortal Beloved. Her character's name is shared with the Greek Muse of comedy. At the Fifth Element convention in London in February 2010, Alastair Cumming (who played Colin Frazer) explained that he is not related to Fiona Cumming (director of the Fifth Doctor serials Castrovalva (1982), Snakedance, Enlightenment (both 1983) and Planet of Fire (1984)), despite frequent reports that she is his mother.

Leela had been written into the script, but Louise Jameson was not available. A few of Leela's actions critical to the plot were therefore given to Nyssa, resulting in a slightly unusually aggressive role for the character.

Commercial releases

In print

A novelisation of this serial, written by Terrance Dicks, was published by Target Books in July 1983.

Home media
Arc of Infinity was released on VHS in March 1994. A double-pack DVD featuring both Time-Flight and Arc of Infinity was released on 6 August 2007. This serial was also released as part of the Doctor Who DVD Files in Issue 108 on 20 February 2013.

References

External links

Target novelisation

On Target — Arc of Infinity

Fifth Doctor serials
Doctor Who serials novelised by Terrance Dicks
1983 British television episodes
Fiction set in 1983
Television episodes set in Amsterdam